Nirmala Gavit is a Shiv Sena politician from Nashik district, Maharashtra. She was a member of Maharashtra Legislative Assembly representing Igatpuri Constituency from 2009 to 2019.

Positions held
 2009: Elected to Maharashtra Legislative Assembly 
 2014: Elected to Maharashtra Legislative Assembly

References

External links
 The Shivsena

Shiv Sena politicians
Marathi politicians
Living people
Year of birth missing (living people)
Indian National Congress politicians